The 2020 BYU Cougars baseball team represented Brigham Young University during the 2020 NCAA Division I baseball season.  Mike Littlewood acted as head coach of the Cougars for an eighth consecutive season. The Cougars were picked to finish second in the WCC Pre-season poll. However they secured more first place votes from the WCC Media than any team with 5 and were named the team to beat by Baseball America. The Cougars never got to play in conference though as all athletic events were shut down by the school March 12 due to COVID-19.

2020 Roster

Schedule 

! style=""| Regular Season
|- 

|- bgcolor="#ccffcc"
| February 14 || vs. Gonzaga || – || Surprise Stadium  || FloBaseball || 7–1 || Reid McLaughlin (1–0) || Daniel Naughton (0–1) || None || 635 || 1–0 || –
|- align="center" bgcolor="ffbbb"
| February 15 || vs. New Mexico || – || Surprise Stadium || FloBaseball || 0–2 || Aaron Makil (1–0) || Cy Neilson (0–1) || None || 741 || 1–1 || –
|- align="center" bgcolor="ffbbb"
| February 15 || vs. New Mexico || – || Surprise Stadium Auxiliary || Facebook || 4–5 || Will Armbruester (1–0) || Carter Smith (0–1) || Miguel Reyes Jr. (1) || 311 || 1–2 || –
|- bgcolor="#ccffcc"
| February 17 || vs. #25 Oregon State || – || Surprise Stadium  || FloBaseball || 4–3 || Drew Zimmerman (1–0) || Joey Mundt (0–1) || Mikade Johnson (1) || 2,598 || 2–2 || –
|- bgcolor="#ccffcc"
| February 20 || at Cal Poly || – || Baggett Stadium  || Big West TV || 3–2 || Justin Sterner (1–0) || Taylor Dollard (1–1) || None || 1,523 || 3–2 || –
|- bgcolor="#ccffcc"
| February 21 || at Cal Poly || – || Baggett Stadium  || Big West TV || 4–3 || Bryce Robinson (1–0) || Kyle Scott (0–1) || None || 1,598 || 4–2 || –
|- align="center" bgcolor="ffbbb"
| February 22 || at Cal Poly || – || Baggett Stadium  || Big West TV || 0–10 || Drew Thorpe (1–0) || Easton Walker (0–1) || None || 1,668 || 4–3 || –
|- bgcolor="#ccffcc"
| February 22 || at Cal Poly || – || Baggett Stadium  || Big West TV || 5–4(14) || Tyson Heaton (1–0) || Bryan Woo (0–1) || None || 1,668 || 5–3 || –
|- align="center" bgcolor="ffbbb"
| February 27 || at New Mexico || – || Santa Ana Star Field  || MW Net || 7–8 || Payton Strambler (1–1) || Reid McLaughlin (2–1) || None || 751 || 5–4 || –
|- align="center" bgcolor="ffbbb"
| February 28 || at New Mexico || – || Santa Ana Star Field  || MW Net || 0–4 || Justin Armbruster (1-0) || Cy Nelson (0–2) || Terrell Hudson (1) || 789 || 5–5 || –
|- bgcolor="#ccffcc"
| February 28 || at New Mexico || – || Santa Ana Star Field  || MW Net || 18–9 || Tyson Heaton (2–0) || Cody Dye (0–2) || None || 789 || 6–5 || –
|- align="center" bgcolor="ffbbb"
| February 29 || at New Mexico || – || Santa Ana Star Field  || MW Net || 1–12 || Nathaniel Garley (1–0) || Easton Walker (0–2) || None || 826 || 6–5 || –
|-

|- bgcolor="#ccffcc"
| March 3 || Utah Valley || – || Larry H. Miller Field  || BYUtv.org || 5–4 || Cooper McKeehan (1–0) || Bobby Voortmeyer (0–2) || Reid McLaughlin (1) || 1,640 || 7–6 || –
|- align="center" bgcolor="ffbbb"
| March 5 || at Oklahoma State || – || Allie P. Reynolds Stadium  || ESPN+ || 0–2 || Scott Parker (3–1) || Cooper McKeehan (1–1) || None  || 382 ||  7–7 || –
|- align="center" bgcolor="ffbbb"
| March 6 || at Oklahoma State || – || Allie P. Reynolds Stadium  || ESPN+ || 1–6 || Justin Campbell (1–2) || Cy Nielson (0–3) || None || 672 || 7–8 || –
|- align="center" bgcolor="ffbbb"
| March 7 || at Oklahoma State || – || Allie P. Reynolds Stadium  ||  ||  3–8 || Bryce Osmond (1–1) || Reid McLaughlin (2–2)' || None || 1,320 || 7–9 || –
|- bgcolor="#CCCCCC"
| March 12 ||  || – || Larry H. Miller Field  || BYUtv.org ||  rowspan="11" colspan=7|  Cancelled- COVID-19|- bgcolor="#CCCCCC"
| March 13 ||  || – || Larry H. Miller Field || BYUtv  
|- bgcolor="#CCCCCC"
| March 14 ||  || – || Larry H. Miller Field  || BYUtv 
|- bgcolor="#CCCCCC"
| March 19 || at Pepperdine* || – || Eddy D. Field Stadium  || WCC Network   
|- bgcolor="#CCCCCC"
| March 20 || at Pepperdine* || – || Eddy D. Field Stadium  || WCC Network   
|- bgcolor="#CCCCCC"
| March 21 || at Pepperdine* || – || Eddy D. Field Stadium  || WCC Network    
|- bgcolor="#CCCCCC"
| March 24 || Utah || – || Larry H. Miller Field  || BYUtv.org   
|- bgcolor="#CCCCCC"
| March 26 || Santa Clara* || – || Larry H. Miller Field  || BYUtv.org  
|- bgcolor="#CCCCCC"
| March 27 || Santa Clara* || – || Larry H. Miller Field  || BYUtv   
|- bgcolor="#CCCCCC"
| March 28 || Santa Clara* || – || Larry H. Miller Field  || BYUtv  
|- bgcolor="#CCCCCC"
| March 30 || at Boise State || – || Memorial Stadium  || MW Net  
|-

|- bgcolor="#CCCCCC"
| April 2 || at Portland* || – || Joe Etzel Field  || WCC Network || rowspan="14" colspan=7|  Cancelled- COVID-19|- bgcolor="#CCCCCC"
| April 3 || at Portland* || – || Joe Etzel Field  || WCC Network  
|- bgcolor="#CCCCCC"
| April 4 || at Portland* || – || Joe Etzel Field  || WCC Network   
|- bgcolor="#CCCCCC"
| April 6 || at Oregon || – || PK Park || P12+ ORE  
|- bgcolor="#CCCCCC"
| April 9 || Pacific* || – || Larry H. Miller Field || BYUtv.org 
|- bgcolor="#CCCCCC"
| April 10 || Pacific* || – || Larry H. Miller Field || BYUtv.org  
|- bgcolor="#CCCCCC"
| April 11 || Pacific* || – || Larry H. Miller Field || BYUtv 
|- bgcolor="#CCCCCC"
| April 13 || Boise State || – || Larry H. Miller Field || BYUtv   
|- bgcolor="#CCCCCC"
| April 16 || San Diego* || – || Larry H. Miller Field || BYUtv.org  
|- bgcolor="#CCCCCC"
| April 17 || San Diego* || – || Larry H. Miller Field || BYUtv 
|- bgcolor="#CCCCCC"
| April 18 || San Diego* || – || Larry H. Miller Field  || BYUtv  
|- bgcolor="#CCCCCC"
| April 21 || Utah || – || Larry H. Miller Field  || BYUtv.org 
|- bgcolor="#CCCCCC"
| April 22 || at Utah Valley || – || UCCU Ballpark  || WAC DN 
|- bgcolor="#CCCCCC"
| April 30 || at San Francisco* || – || Dante Benedetti Diamond at Max Ulrich Field  || WCC Network   
|-

|- bgcolor="#CCCCCC"
| May 1 || at San Francisco* ||  || Dante Benedetti Diamond at Max Ulrich Field  || WCC Network ||  rowspan="10" colspan=7|  Cancelled- COVID-19|- bgcolor="#CCCCCC"
| May 2 || at San Francisco* || – || Dante Benedetti Diamond at Max Ulrich Field  || WCC Network 
|- bgcolor="#CCCCCC"
| May 4 || Cal Baptist || – || Larry H. Miller Field  || BYUtv 
|- bgcolor="#CCCCCC"
| May 7 || at Saint Mary's* || – || Louis Guisto Field || WCC Network  
|- bgcolor="#CCCCCC"
| May 8 || at Saint Mary's* || – || Louis Guisto Field  || WCC Network 
|- bgcolor="#CCCCCC"
| May 9 || at Saint Mary's* || – || Louis Guisto Field  || WCC Network 
|- bgcolor="#CCCCCC"
| May 12 || at Utah || – || Smith's Ballpark  || P12 
|- bgcolor="#CCCCCC"
|May 14 || at Gonzaga* || – || Washington Trust Field and Patterson Baseball Complex || ESPNU 
|- bgcolor="#CCCCCC"
|May 15 || at Gonzaga* || – || Washington Trust Field and Patterson Baseball Complex || WCC Network 
|- bgcolor="#CCCCCC"
|May 16 || at Gonzaga* || – || Washington Trust Field and Patterson Baseball Complex || WCC Network 
|-

|-
! style=""| 2020 West Coast Conference Baseball Tournament
|- 

|- bgcolor="#CCCCCC"
|May 21–23 ||  || – || Banner Island Ballpark || WCC Network ||  colspan=7|  Cancelled- COVID-19|-

| Rankings from Collegiate Baseball. Parenthesis indicate tournament seedings.
|-
| *West Coast Conference games

Rivalries
BYU had two main rivalries on their schedule- the Deseret First Duel vs. Utah and the UCCU Crosstown Clash vs. Utah Valley. The first game against UVU was played, but the remaining 3 rivalry games were cancelled because of COVID-19.

Radio Information
For the third consecutive season BYU Baseball was broadcast as part of the NuSkin BYU Sports Network, and for the second time ever every BYU Baseball game was broadcast on radio. Brent Norton was scheduled to provide play-by-play for his 28th consecutive season beginning with conference play, but when all games beginning March 12 were canceled it was Jason Shepherd who had called every game. Tuckett Slade provided analysis for all but 1 games. Games were carried on KOVO and KUMT. KOVO had 3 exclusives (Gm. 1 Feb. 15, Gm. 2 Feb. 22, and Gm. 2 Feb. 28), while BYU Radio's KUMT had 4 exclusives (Gm. 2 Feb. 15, Feb. 20, Gm. 1 Feb. 22, and Mar. 7). All games were carried live on the BYU Sports Radio App and are archived on BYU Radio.

TV Announcers
Feb 14: Zachary Anderson-Yoxsimer
Feb 15 (1): Zachary Anderson-YoxsimerFeb 15 (2): Jason Shepherd & Brock Hale
Feb 17: Zachary Anderson-YoxsimerFeb 20: Zachary Anderson-YoxsimerFeb 21: Chris Sylvester
Feb 22 (1): Chris SylvesterFeb 22 (2): Zachary Anderson-YoxsimerFeb 27: Robert Portnoy
Feb 28 (1): Robert PortnoyFeb 28 (2): Robert PortnoyFeb 29: Robert PortnoyMar 3: Spencer Linton & Gary SheideMar 5: Dave Hunziker & Tom Holliday
Mar 6: Dave Hunziker & Tom Holliday''

References 

2020 West Coast Conference baseball season
2020 team
2020 in sports in Utah